HM Treasury v Ahmed [2010] UKSC 2 is a UK constitutional law and human rights case concerning the United Nations Act 1946 and the powers it grants to the executive to issue terrorism control orders.

Facts
Under the United Nations Act 1946 section 1, the UK passed the Terrorism (United Nations Measures) Order 2006 and the Al-Qaida and Taliban (United Nations Measures) Order 2006, to fulfil its obligations under the UN Charter, article 25, to give effect to UN Security Council Resolution 1373 (2001). The aim was to prevent financing for terrorism. They allowed freezing of economic assets, apart from basic expenses, of anyone designated by the order. Article 4(1)(2) of the Terrorism Order allowed the Treasury to designate anybody it had reasonable grounds to suspect “is or may be” helping terrorism. Article 3(1)(b) of the Al-Quida Order stated people on the UN Security Council's "sanctions committee" list was a designate person. The Treasury had designated Mohammed Jabar Ahmed, as well as Mohammed al-Ghabra and Hani El Sayed Sabaei Youssef, as suspects, their bank accounts were frozen, although they were given licences to receive social security benefits. They applied for the order to be set aside.

Collins J held the orders were ultra vires of the United Nations Act 1946 section 1, and quashed them, and the directions. On appeal, the Court of Appeal allowed an appeal by the Treasury in part. If the words "or may be" were removed from the test of reasonable suspicion on which the Treasury's directions were based, then article 4 of the Terrorism Order was valid. The Al-Qaida Order was also lawful, although a designated person could still seek judicial review of his designation. Ahmed then claimed judicial review for being listed, or alternatively sought the Al-Qaida Order be quashed. The judge at first instance then declared the Al Qaida Order was ultra vires in respect of Ahmed but did not quash it. The Treasury appealed directly to the Supreme Court.

Judgment
The Supreme Court held that fundamental rights could only be overridden by express language or with necessary implication, and so the general wording of section 1 of the United Nations Act 1946 did not empower the government to pass the Order. Resolution 1373 (2001) was not phrased in terms of reasonable suspicion, so by introducing such a test the Terrorism (United Nations Measures) Order 2006 went beyond what was necessary to comply with the Resolution. This meant the Terrorism Order was ultra vires.

On the Al-Qaida Order the Supreme Court held (Lord Brown dissenting) that it gave effect to the sanctions committee procedure, which itself had no provision for basic procedural fairness. This deprived designated people of the fundamental right to access an effective judicial remedy. Accordingly, article 3(1)(b) of the Al-Qaida Order was ultra vires.

On the Treasury's application for suspension of the court's order, it was held that the court should not lend itself to a procedure which was designed to obfuscate the effect of its judgment and so no part of the court's order would be suspended.

Lord Hope (with Lord Walker and Lady Hale agreeing) said the following.

Significance
This case overturned the method by which, through Statutory Orders, the UK complied with UNSC Resolution 1373. It forced the government of Gordon Brown to conceive and pass within a week the Terrorist Asset-Freezing (Temporary Provisions) Act 2010.

See also
UK constitutional law
UK civil liberties
Hani al-Sibai

Notes

References

United Kingdom administrative case law
English contract case law
2010 in British law
2010 in case law
Supreme Court of the United Kingdom cases
Human rights in the United Kingdom
United Kingdom constitutional case law